Lárus Guðmundsson (born 12 December 1961) is an Icelandic former professional footballer who played as a striker.

Club career
Guðmundsson started his career at Víkingur and later became successful in the German Bundesliga with Bayer Uerdingen and 1. FC Kaiserslautern.

International career
He made his debut for Iceland in 1980 and went on to win 17 caps, scoring three goals.

Honours
Bayer Uerdingen
 DFB-Pokal: 1984–85

References

External links
 
 

1961 births
Living people
Larus Gudmundsson
Larus Gudmundsson
Larus Gudmundsson
Larus Gudmundsson
1. FC Kaiserslautern players
K. Waterschei S.V. Thor Genk players
KFC Uerdingen 05 players
Belgian Pro League players
Bundesliga players
Icelandic expatriate footballers
Expatriate footballers in Belgium
Expatriate footballers in Germany
Icelandic expatriate sportspeople in Belgium
Icelandic expatriate sportspeople in Germany
Larus Gudmundsson
Association football forwards
Icelandic football managers